Black haw is a common name for several woody plants and may refer to:

 Sideroxylon lanuginosum
 Viburnum lentago, native to North America
 Viburnum prunifolium 
 Viburnum rufidulum (Rusty blackhaw)